Gemma Hallett (born 24 August 1981) is a Welsh rugby union retired professional player who has played second row and number 8, earning 35 caps for Wales.

Hallett started her international career making her appearance in the Welsh Students squad in April 2004 coached by Nadine Griffiths. Hallett along with scrum half Laura Prosser were selected to join the Welsh Development team where they played in fixtures against England A, both Hallett and Prosser were late call up replacements for the injured Mellissa Berry and Beth Gallacher for the national squad tour of South Africa in the summer of 2004. Hallett came off the bench to earn her first taste of senior international rugby to face Eastern Province.

She was part of the Welsh teams that won the Triple Crown in 2009, played in the 2010 Women's Rugby World Cup, and secured qualification for the 2014 Women's Rugby World Cup.

Since retiring from rugby Gemma has also been a Sky Sports pundit for the 2014 Rugby World Cup and commentator for the Women's Six Nations, for the BBC and World Rugby Live feed.

Rugby Player

Early Years

After impressing then coach Nadine Griffiths for the Welsh students squad whilst in university, Hallett was invited to join the tour to South Africa in 2004. It is during this time a desire to play for the National squad took hold.

In 2005 following her graduation, she embarked on a season playing in Australia for Sydney's Eastern Suburbs. She enjoyed a season of running rugby where she played at No. 8, and captained the team against a touring Singapore side.

National Team 
Following her return to Wales, and a switch of positions to second row, she made her full Wales International debut earning her first cap against Italy in the Autumn of 2006 at Cardiff's Glamorgan Wanderer's ground, followed a week later by a starting position against the Netherlands at Llanrhumney playing fields.

She scored her only international try against Sweden in November 2009.

Hallett became a regular international from 2006 to 2010 where she earned 30 caps across Six Nations, European Championships and World Cup playing in each fixture, only missing two games through a knee medial injury during the 2008 Six Nations. Though Hallett grew into her role as a senior squad member, she was also known for her playfulness and camaraderie off the field. often responsible for social activities.

Hallett had a key role in starting all of Wales's World Cup games at England 2010. A tournament which saw her struggling with an allergic reaction to the antibiotics she was taking to combat a viral infection. She was ordered to bed rest for the days in between matches during the later part of the tournament.

Sabbatical 
Hallett intended this tournament to be her last as she retired from the sport to travel several countries. During her travels to New Zealand Hallett found herself playing for Stoke Rugby Club in Nelson, making her mark back at number 8, topping the league and making it to the playoffs.

When the season ended she was asked to blog on behalf of the Welsh Rugby Union from a supporters perspective whilst travelling and supporting Wales' men team around the north island competing in the 2011 Rugby World Cup.

Return to Wales

Hallett returned to Wales and her Welsh club Pontyclun to continue playing one more season at amateur level. Following a series of good performances, echoing the style she had enjoyed in New Zealand, she captured the eyes of Cardiff Blues and National coaches and was called back into the National set up.

She was made Vice Captain for the 2013 Six Nations squad and captained the team in their warm up fixtures and game against France for the injured skipper Rachel Taylor. Her last game for Wales was the final 6 nations game against England that year.

The same season Hallett was named Premiership Player of The Year at the annual WRU women's dinner, where she was presented with a trophy by her playing idol; Scott Quinnell.

Hallett also captained the Cardiff Blues squad in 2012 and 2013 campaigns. In 2013, she made history in being the first woman to captain a Cardiff Blues side at the Cardiff Arms Park. During this campaign she led the Blues team to be regional champions after a thrilling match against the Ospreys. She openly expressed this as one of her proudest rugby moments.

Overlooked by Wales

After her most successful season in rugby Hallett was dropped from the Welsh squad and failed to make Rhys Edwards' 2014 Six Nations squad. Hallett has since proclaimed that she voiced her disapproval over the WRU managements decision to withdraw Wales Women from the RBS 6 Nations tournament and into a second-tier competition.

Being out of the international set up allowed Hallett the opportunity to represent invitational team the Nomads in World Cup 2014 warm up matches against Wales at the National Centre of Excellence and two fixtures against South Africa in their World Cup preparations in England.

Her final game came in November 2014 where she led the Cardiff Blues invitational team in a historic encounter against the Combined Services, for a commemorative fixture marking the 100 year anniversary of Remembrance, played at the Cardiff Arms Park  where she led the Blues to a 17–12 victory in atrocious conditions.

In Retirement
Since retiring from playing and coaching, Hallett has provided pitch-side commentary and studio punditry for Sky Sports, World Rugby, S4C and BBC.

In her farewell to the rugby world, Hallett used her voice and platform one final time to raise awareness and voice her concerns of the WRU failings in her blog piece “How the WRU Failed it’s Women”. In an open letter to the powers that be, she wrote a strongly-held view as to why the Welsh team underperformance in the 2020 Women's Six Nations and a plea for the 'custodians of today's game to lead with optimism and provide a clear pathway for Welsh women's rugby players into a new decade of performance and growth'.

Hallett is now an advocate for elite Women's performance pathways in Wales and was an integral part of reaching out to the WRU and led 123 former player to write to the WRU and demand action. She regularly takes to twitter to call out the inaction of the WRU in providing pathways or repairing the damage they have caused to the elite game.

Entrepreneur 
Gemma is now the CEO and founder of miFuture where she is digitally disrupting the school leaving process for Generation Z. She took redundancy from her teaching job to start a social business that helps mobilise school leavers and those furthest from the labour market towards better futures and advocates for young people that choose not to go to university or are less privileged than those who can.

Pushing boundaries with innovation and challenging the status quo, Gemma has become a successful tech for good/ social entrepreneur for her innovation with miFuture and coproduction of a solution that's been built with young people, for young people.

She's blending profit and purpose to mobilise a generation of school leavers towards jobs, courses, apprenticeship and volunteering experiences. Following a successful pilot, she is now taking miFuture app nationwide with a clear vision of 'mobilising a 100,000 young people towards employability and prosperity'. Stating that she just wants to "make an impactful solution for the millions of young people that are not going to uni. To empower those most marginalised and nudge all school leavers towards better-skilled future-focussed careers"  when miFuture was announced as one of 9, impactful companies from 7 different countries, semi-finalists for the 2021 Impact Summit competition.

Gemma has expressed her desire to meet a wider UK and global need, but insists that even though there has always been a compelling argument to consider moving the business outside of Wales. Claiming "I’m a proud Welsh Woman, and leaving won’t solve the school leavers issue so prominent here in Wales".

In 2021 she will launch two leading edge functions that will further support young people, those living in generational poverty and those furthest from the labour market. ‘miFuture 2.0’ will include the release of an AI powered interview preparation tool and ground breaking Skill Bursts. Which will see miFuture achieve its goal of becoming the complete careers app for generation Z and change behavioural habits in moving young people towards better skilled higher paid futures.

As a response to COVID-19 Gemma decided to release all the technology and service for free for all partners, collaborators and to support everyone in the school leavers ecosystem and ensure that energy can still be poured into a generation that is going to be so negatively impacted by the economic fall out of the pandemic 

Gemma has big plans going forward and in a recent interview she was asked ‘What can we expect from miFuture in 2021?’ She replied “We are going hard on skills, for sure. Really pushing boundaries on ways we can leverage a young persons skillset to match them to local sector needs. All through mobile gamification. It’s not been done before and it’ll be a game changer”.

And was also asked ‘So what’s beyond 2021 for miFuture?’ She replied “Pushing more boundaries for sure, we are beginning to explore space in alternative education. And we are joining forces with other global projects to tackle issues #GenZ feel passionate about; Climate Crisis and Youth & LGBTQ+ Youth Homelessness”.

Achievements and Acknowledgements 

 2021 Global Impact Summit Competition Semi Finalists 
Ranked 14th of top 50 Tech firms in Wales 
Three trailblazing female entrepreneurs reveal their hopes for the year ahead
  30 Inspiring Welsh businesswomen
Tech4Good Awards 
 Social Entrepreneurs recognised in parliament
Wales Start-Up Award Winner
 EdTech50 One to Watch 
 Unltd Social Entrepreneur Winner 
 EdTech startup Winner 
Social Enterprise Roll of Honour 2020 
 Nesta Challenge Winner
 Ideas and Pioneers Winner (Paul Hamlyn Foundation)
 Acknowledged in Wales 4.0 as a driver of transformation https://gov.wales/sites/default/files/publications/2019-09/delivering-economic-transformation-for-a-better-future-of-work.pdf
 Contributor to Welsh Government’s Economy, Infrastructure and Skills Committee

References

External links 
 Rugby World Interview
 Gemma Hallett RWC2010 Squad Announcement
 World Cup 2010 Images
 Hallett Returns to International Rugby
 Player Stats

1981 births
Living people
Alumni of the University of South Wales
Welsh female rugby union players